Herbert Alexander "Herb, Hap" Hamel (June 8, 1904 – April 20, 2001) was a Canadian professional ice hockey player who played two games in the National Hockey League with the Toronto Maple Leafs during the 1930–31 season. The rest of his career, which lasted from 1926 to 1935, was spent in the minor leagues. Hamel was born in New Hamburg, Ontario.

Career statistics

Regular season and playoffs

External links
 

1904 births
2001 deaths
Brantford Indians players
Canadian ice hockey right wingers
Hamilton Tigers (CPHL) players
Ice hockey people from Ontario
Niagara Falls Cataracts players
People from the Regional Municipality of Waterloo
Toronto Maple Leafs players
Stratford Nationals players